Mirko Giacomo Nenzi (born 14 November 1989) is an Italian speed skater. He finished sixth in the men's 1000 metres event at the 2013 World Single Distance Championships. At the 2013–14 ISU Speed Skating World Cup – World Cup 3 he won a silver medal, again in the 1000 metres.

References

1989 births
Living people
Italian male speed skaters
Speed skaters at the 2014 Winter Olympics
Speed skaters at the 2018 Winter Olympics
Olympic speed skaters of Italy
Sportspeople from Venice
Universiade medalists in speed skating
Universiade gold medalists for Italy
Universiade silver medalists for Italy
Competitors at the 2013 Winter Universiade
20th-century Italian people
21st-century Italian people